The 1956 24 Hours of Le Mans was a race for Sports Cars which took place on 28 and 29 July 1956 on the Circuit de la Sarthe. The race was won by Ron Flockhart and Ninian Sanderson driving a Jaguar D-Type for the new Ecurie Ecosse team. This race also marked the golden jubilee of the Automobile Club de l'Ouest (ACO) founded in 1906, however because of the previous year's disaster, celebrations were deferred to 1957 to go along with the imminent 25th anniversary of the race.

Following the events of 1955, the front stretch and pit lane were redesigned in order to enhance driver and spectator safety.  This involved a change to the layout of the Dunlop curve, shortening the overall length of the track by 31 meters.

This race saw the death of French driver Louis Héry when his Monopole was involved in an accident early in the race.

Regulations
The official enquiry into the 1955 Le Mans disaster found severe deficiencies in the track layout along the main straight and for quite some time there were serious concerns for the future of the race. However, the ACO took all the recommendations on board and was able to convince the French government for continuation. The extensive renovations cost FF300 million, moving 70000 cubic metres of earth and meant the race was delayed 7 weeks to the end of July.

The pit straight was redesigned: it was widened by 13m (giving room for a deceleration lane), the small kink removed by straightening the approach, and the Dunlop curve realigned, steepened and eased, moving the Dunlop Bridge.  This all had the effect of shortening the lap by 31 metres. The grandstand was demolished and rebuilt with new spectator terraces beyond a ditch between the track. The postwar pits were also torn down and a new 3-storey complex built giving more space for crews and with hospitality suites above (although there was still no barrier out to the racing line). This limited the number of starters to 52, down from 60.

Elsewhere on the track, the Indianapolis and Maison Blanche corners were also widened and resurfaced, and a dangerous hump on the road after Arnage was removed. A new “signalling pits” was built just after the Mulsanne corner (in the same place Bentley had used 20 years earlier with a phone-link back to the pits) so as to reduce crew congestion and driver distraction on the critical pit straight area.

Regarding new regulations, the ACO also set a number of new restrictions with a view to limit maximum speeds. Prototypes were now given a maximum engine size of 2.5L. Production cars had to have 50 units “built, sold or provided for” and were still unrestricted in engine capacity. These new limits put the ACO out of step with the FIA and hence the race was dropped from the 1956 World Sportscar Championship. Full-width windscreens, at least 200mm, high were also mandatory further trimming top-speed. Other effects to encourage economy limited all fuel tanks to a maximum size of 130 litres, and the liquids replenishment (fuel, oil, water) window was extended again, from 32 to 34 laps (458 km / 284 miles) meaning a minimum practical fuel economy of 10.8mpg would be needed. Finally, drivers were now only allowed to do 72 consecutive laps and 14 hours in total.

Entries
Although Mercedes-Benz and Cunningham had withdrawn from racing, there was still strong support from the car manufacturers and 14 sent works-entries.

To some surprise, Jaguar and Aston Martin were able to present cases to the ACO that their current cars qualified as production models. Jaguar brought three of its updated D-types (now 130 kg lighter and up to 275 bhp), the lead car of Mike Hawthorn / Ivor Bueb equipped with fuel-injection. Their other drivers were the experienced Jack Fairman and Ken Wharton, and Paul Frère with new team-member Desmond Titterington. The team arrived in red-hot form after a comprehensive 1-2-3-4 result at the Reims 12-hour race. The reliable ally, Equipe Nationale Belge, fielded a new production D-Type. It also saw the arrival of Scotsman David Murray (racing driver)’s new Ecurie Ecosse under team manager Walter “Wilkie” Wilkinson. Murray's drivers were fellow-Scots Ron Flockhart and Ninian Sanderson, stepping up from the smaller classes. In the absence of the big Cunninghams and Talbots this year, the Jaguars had the S-5000 class to themselves.

Two true production cars, privately entered into the race, were a Jaguar XK140 and a gull-wing Mercedes-Benz 300SL.

Aston Martin returned with a pair of the DB3S, nominally production models but allowed non-standard components. Again, a strong driver line-up was represented, including Stirling Moss (now a works driver for Maserati, which was not at Le Mans this year) with Peter Collins and Roy Salvadori with Peter Walker. The team, having abandoned its Lagonda project, instead arrived with its own new 2.5L prototype – the DBR1/250. Its smaller engine still managed to produce virtually the same power (212 bhp) as its big brothers. It was driven by F1 drivers Reg Parnell and Tony Brooks

Ferrari, without the production facilities to compete with the British, instead had to create a new 2.5L ‘prototype’ for, essentially, the one-off race at Le Mans. Engineer Vittorio Jano developed last year's 2.5L S-4 grand-prix engine and put it into a chassis adapted from the new 500 TR (the inaugural version of the “Testarossa”). Called the 625 LM, it gave 225 bhp giving a maximum speed of 230 km/h – 10 km/h slower than the Jaguars. Team drivers were race-winner Maurice Trintignant and Olivier Gendebien, Phil Hill and André Simon and Spanish noble 'Marquis' Alfonso de Portago with Duncan Hamilton (fired from Jaguar for ignoring team orders at the Rheims race once too often). Although the 2.0L V12 in the 500 TR was considered too weak by the factory to take on the Jaguars, there were three private-entries including a second car for the Equipe Nationale Belge.

Like Ferrari, French manufacturers Gordini and Talbot could not produce enough to meet the ACO requirements and therefore would have to enter their cars as prototypes. Gordini had two 2.5L cars and a smaller car in the S-1500 category. The larger cars trialled different engines: one using the 2.5L Straight-8 in the Grand Prix cars, and the other a new, more powerful, Straight-6 version (giving about 230 bhp). Talbot, now in receivership and in a change of tack, had adapted the 2.5L grand-prix engine from the Maserati 250F to their new sports cars. Two cars were entered for Jean Behra with Louis Rosier and Jean Lucas with pre-war Maserati veteran Geoffredo “Freddie” Zehender.

After their great success in the previous race, Porsche returned in force with new cars: a pair of 550A Coupés and a 356 Carrera production model. The new car had famously recently beaten the bigger works Ferraris and Maseratis in the non-Championship Targa Florio. The factory also supported a further a pair of older, privately entered 550 RS spyders and a 356A. Competing in the S-1500 class were a pair of private Maseratis and Colin Chapman’s Lotus 11 with the new FWB-Climax engine. His two other cars still used the smaller 1098cc FWA-Climax engine. The other entrants in the S-1100 class were Cooper’s T39 using the same Climax engine, and a tiny French RB fitted with an OSCA 1093cc engine.

For once the smallest, S-750, class was not the preserve of the French. Italian manufacturers Stanguellini and Moretti both sent two-car entries, and OSCA a single car. They were up against a strong DB-works entry of four cars, and three Monopoles. Panhard had closed its racing department after the 1955 disaster and appointed Monopole, effectively as its works team.

Over the flying kilometre on the Mulsanne straight, the following top speeds this year were recorded this year:

Practice
This year there were only the two practice sessions assigned – on the Wednesday and Thursday. Hawthorn set the fastest lap of 4:16.0 early on. Titterington was barely 3 seconds slower but then he demolished his car in an accident, forcing the team to prepare the spare car for the race. The best Moss could do in the Aston Martin was a 4:27 Meanwhile, the team was also finding the fuel consumption of their prototype DBR1, easily the noisiest car in the field, was excessive and therefore needed to trim it back to be able to get through the race. Most of the other larger cars were also doing checks on their fuel consumption for the new regulations, and having to adjust their engine settings accordingly

As a comparison, some of the lap-times recorded during practice were:

Race

Start
The allure of the race was as great as ever and huge crowds returned, keen restore the traditional festive atmosphere. An immaculately observed minute's silence was held before the start of the race for the previous year's victims and a simple commemorative plaque unveiled.

The race started in light drizzle, making the new track surface treacherously greasy. As usual, Moss was lightning-quick and first off the line in his Aston Martin. Hawthorn's more powerful Jaguar blasted past him on the back straight and led at the end of the first lap. On lap three, Paul Frère got it sideways in the narrow Esses and spun his Jaguar. Fairman, close behind in the sister car, slammed on the brakes and also spun, then de Portago arrived unsighted and with nowhere to go broadsided Fairman. All three cars got going again: Frère limped on but came to a halt on the Mulsanne straight. De Portago got a bit further but the Ferrari's oil cooler was smashed. Fairman got to the pits but the damage was too severe to repair. Ten minutes gone and three of the leading works entries were already eliminated. Hill's Ferrari barely managed to skate through his teammate's oil, but soon his clutch started to fail. More drama occurred minutes later when Hawthorn came in from the lead with an engine misfire. It was eventually traced to a hairline crack in a fuel line – the delay and repair cost an hour, and 21 laps, and dropped the remaining works Jaguar out of contention.

But worse had happened between these issues: Louis Héry, local garage owner in his second Le Mans, crashed his private Monopole-Panhard heavily at Maison Blanche. The car rolled and tore itself apart. Héry, critically injured, died in the ambulance en route to the hospital.

On lap 7, Flockhart used his superior speed to get his Ecosse Jaguar into the lead, but the veteran drivers Moss and Walker kept their Aston Martins in contact. After the first pit-stops and driver-changes Sanderson put the Ecosse Jaguar onto a more conservative race strategy and Collins took the lead in the 3rd hour as the rain got heavier. The two remaining works Ferraris moved up to 3rd and 4th when the Walker/Salvadori Aston was delayed by ignition problems. Yet again Gordini was quick and competitive – the T15 of Manzon and Guichet, with the 2.5L F1 engine, holding a solid 5th place, and its sister car a couple of places behind tussling with the Belgian Jaguar.

Night
Being run a month later, the night was that bit longer and intermittent showers persisted through the night. Just before 10pm on the run from Maison Blanche to the pits Fernand Tavano's Testarossa went off the road, spun and hit the bank. Facing the opposite direction, his headlights blinded ’Helm’ Glöckler whose Porsche Carrera ran straight into the Ferrari. Tavano was thrown clear by the heavy impact as his car was shoved into the roadside ditch, but the Porsche rolled and burst into flames. Glöckler was pulled out by rescuers with minor burns and a broken leg.

By midnight Sanderson had retaken the lead, yet as the track got damp again, the experience of the F1 racers showed and Moss & Collins retook the lead by 3am, with Gendebien/Trintignant third, four laps down. Hill/Simon running 4th, had been changing gears with no clutch until they were forced out with rear axle failure just before half-time. The remarkable Porsche 550s were running 5th and 6th. Near the end of the night though Maglioli's leading Porsche was slowed and eventually stopped by engine issues. The prototype Aston Martin was surprising many, running in the top-10, and by the early hours of the morning had climbed up to 4th. Sadly for the partisan crowd, both Gordinis had fallen by the wayside with engine problems. In the small hours Cliff Allison’s Lotus, doing 190 km/h, struck a dog chasing a rabbit on the Mulsanne Straight wrecking the radiator.

Morning
The rain stopped for a while around dawn and that suited the bigger Jaguar, and they retook the lead and by 8am had built a 3-minute margin. Soon after dawn the last of the 2-litre class was out – the Ferrari of Jean Lucas, having got into the top-10, was disqualified for refuelling two laps too early. Around 7.30, in a sudden downpour, Peter Walker, running 8th, crashed heavily at the Dunlop bridge just after the pits. The car rolled and sat in the middle of the road but the driver was able to get out with just cuts, bruises and a broken finger. Later in the morning Moss and Collins lost their 2nd gear, limiting their chase and they gradually gave up ground. Around noon the Talbot of Behra/Rosier was stopped by a broken rear axle. They had barely kept up with the Aston Martin, Ferraris and Gordinis in its class, but through attrition, had been able to move up to 8th by the time they retired.

Finish and post-race

The leading cars remained reliable and reached the finish, except the Aston Martin prototype which, having slipped to 7th with engine problems, broke its rear suspension in the final hour.
 
The Ecosse Jaguar won by a lap from the Aston Martin. The Ferraris were never able to compete with the leaders but Gendebien/Trintignant came home third a further six laps back. Yet again the Belgian Jaguar had a good run, this time finishing 4th, fully 16 laps behind the winner. The leading Porsche of von Trips and von Frankenberg was 5th, just missing out on the Index of Performance, but finishing an enormous 37 laps ahead of the only other class-finisher: the privateer Maserati of Bourillot/Perroud in 9th. Having been driving up from the back of the field for 23 hours, Hawthorn and Bueb finished a commendable 6th place, with Hawthorn's determination getting him the race's fastest lap, albeit well down on the previous year.

The rivalry between the Climax-engined kit-cars went the way of Lotus. Jopp and Bicknell had retaken the S-1100 lead around 11am after the Cooper of Americans Hugus and Bentley had held it for 12 hours, and finished just over a lap ahead with the cars finishing 7th and 8th overall. The DB works team did well again with three of their four cars finishing (in 10th, 11th and 12th overall), and taking the valuable Index of Performance prize

A mere 13 finishers were classified (the lowest ratio of the decade), and given the wet conditions it was no surprise that there were 16 major accidents. It was a credit to the preparation and organisation of the fledgling Ecurie Ecosse team to win on its first attempt at Le Mans.

Although not one of the event's most exciting races it was, nevertheless, a testament to the dedication and tradition of the ACO that it was able to overcome the disaster of the 1955 race. This was the final race overseen by Charles Faroux, engineer and journalist, who was the co-founder of the race; he died the following February aged 74. Closely involved in international motor-racing administration he was also the race director for the Monaco Grand Prix.

Official results
Results taken from Quentin Spurring's book, officially licensed by the ACO

Note *: Not Classified because of Insufficient distance covered

Did Not Finish

Index of Performance

Note: Only the top ten positions are included in this set of standings. A score of 1.00 means meeting the minimum distance for the car, and a higher score is exceeding the nominal target distance.

22nd Rudge-Whitworth Biennial Cup (1955/1956)

Note: Only the top three positions are included in this set of standings.

Statistics
Taken from Quentin Spurring's book, officially licensed by the ACO
 Fastest Lap in practice – 	Hawthorn, #1 Jaguar D-Type – 4m 16.0s; 186.20 kp/h (117.56 mph)
 Fastest Lap – Hawthorn, #1 Jaguar D-Type – 4m 20.0s; 186.38 kp/h (115.82 mph)
 Distance - 
 Winner's Average Speed - 
 Attendance –  250 000

Citations

References
 Spurring, Quentin (2011)    Le Mans 1949-59 Sherborne, Dorset: Evro Publishing  
 Clarke, R.M. - editor (1997)    Le Mans 'The Jaguar Years 1949-1957'    Cobham, Surrey: Brooklands Books  
 Clausager, Anders (1982)    Le Mans London: Arthur Barker Ltd  
 Laban, Brian (2001)    Le Mans 24 Hours London: Virgin Books   
 Moity, Christian (1974)    The Le Mans 24 Hour Race 1949-1973 Radnor, Pennsylvania: Chilton Book Co  
 Pomeroy, L. & Walkerley, R. - editors (1957)    The Motor Year Book 1957 Bath: The Pitman Press

External links
 Racing Sports Cars – Le Mans 24 Hours 1956 entries, results, technical detail. Retrieved 1 February 2017
 Le Mans History – Le Mans History, hour-by-hour (incl. pictures, YouTube links). Retrieved 1 February 2017
 World Sports Racing Prototypes – Le Mans 1956 results, reserve entries & chassis numbers. Retrieved 1 February 2017
 Formula 2 – Le Mans 1956 results & reserve entries. Retrieved 1 February 2017
 YouTube a lap of the circuit in Mike Hawthorn's Jaguar, with his commentary
 YouTube	amateur film of the 1956 scrutineering & race, in colour (12 mins)

24 Hours of Le Mans races
Le Mans
1956 in French motorsport